Robert Goetsch is a former member of the Wisconsin State Assembly.

Biography
Goetsch was born on August 5, 1933 in Juneau, Wisconsin. He would attend Wayland Junior College and the University of Wisconsin-Madison and serve in the United States Army. Goetsch is a widower with two children.

Career
Goetsch was first elected to the Assembly in 1982. He remained a member until 2001. Goetsch was succeeded by Jeff Fitzgerald, who later became Speaker of the Assembly. Additionally, he was a member of the Oak Grove, Dodge County, Wisconsin Town Board from 1971 to 1983, serving as Chairman from 1975 to 1983, and of the Dodge County, Wisconsin Board from 1972 to 1984. Goetsch is a Republican.

References

People from Juneau, Wisconsin
Republican Party members of the Wisconsin State Assembly
Wisconsin city council members
Military personnel from Wisconsin
United States Army soldiers
University of Wisconsin–Madison alumni
1933 births
Living people